Stanley White (12 March 1910 – 9 December 1981) was a South African cricketer. He played in 36 first-class matches from 1928/29 to 1939/40.

References

External links
 

1910 births
1981 deaths
South African cricketers
Border cricketers
Eastern Province cricketers
People from Makhanda, Eastern Cape
Cricketers from the Eastern Cape